Samuel Frederick Brocas (c. 1792 – 14 May 1847) was an Irish artist best known for his series depicting Dublin known as the Select views of Dublin.

Early life
Samuel Frederick Brocas was born in Dublin around 1792. He was the second of the four sons of painter Henry Brocas. From 1803 to 1807, Brocas studied under his father at the Dublin Society Schools. During this time he won medals for flower painting in 1801, etching in 1802 and figure drawing in 1807. He was best known for his topographical views, and landscapes in oils and watercolours, working mostly in Dublin, and in Limerick at times.

Career

Brocas was exhibited in Dublin in 1804, 1809 and 1812. The Royal Hibernian Academy (RHA) exhibited his landscapes for the first time in 1828, with pieces depicting the north of Wales, and he continued to exhibit with the RHA until 1847. His best known set of works is his 12 views of Dublin city from 1817. These were engraved by his brother Henry, and printed by J. Le Petit of Dublin between 1818 and 1829 entitled Select views of Dublin. They were planned to be part of a book, Book of views of Ireland, but this was never published. From his address, 15 Henry Street, where Brocas lived with his father, he published the folio lithograph he produced, King John's Castle Limerick, in 1826. A view of Trinity College and the east portico of the Bank of Ireland is another of the lithographs he produced and published in Dublin. He was also a member of the Society of Artists.

He died at his home 120 Lower Baggot Street, Dublin on 14 May 1847. The National Gallery of Ireland holds a number of works by him, including two watercolours depicting views of Dublin. The V&A Museum and the British Museum each hold two paintings by him.

Select views of Dublin

These were published in the following order:

View of the Four Courts, looking down the River Liffey, Dublin
View of the Corn Exchange, Burgh Quay, and Custom House, Dublin
View from Carlisle Bridge, Dublin
View of the Post Office and Nelson's Pillar, Sackville Street, Dublin
View of the Lying-in Hospital and Rutland Square, Dublin
View of the Castle Gate and Royal Exchange, Dublin
View of the Royal Exchange, Dame Street, Dublin
View of the Bank of Ireland, College Green, Dublin
College Green, Dublin
View of the Custom House, from the River Liffey, Dublin
View of the Castle Chapel, Dublin
View of Trinity College from Westmoreland Street, Dublin

References

1790s births
1847 deaths
Irish artists
Artists from Dublin (city)